Caulostramina is a monotypic plant genus in the family Brassicaceae containing the single species Caulostramina jaegeri, which is known by the common name cliffdweller.

The cliffdweller is a rare plant endemic to Inyo County, California, where it is found only in the White and Inyo Mountains. This plant grows on rocky mountainsides and sprouts from cliffs.

Caulostramina jaegeri is a hardy woody perennial herb bearing hairless green leaves and white to pale purple flowers with spoon-shaped, purple-streaked petals. The seeds are borne in cylindrical fruits.

External links

 Jepson Manual Treatment - Caulostramina jaegeri
 USDA Plants Profile: Caulostramina jaegeri
 Caulostramina jaegeri - Photo gallery

Brassicaceae
Endemic flora of California
Natural history of Inyo County, California
Inyo Mountains
•
Monotypic Brassicaceae genera
Flora without expected TNC conservation status